

The Brush Creek Work Center in Medicine Bow National Forest near Saratoga, Wyoming is a ranger station of the USDA Forest Service, Region 2 that was built during 1937-41 and is listed on the National Register of Historic Places.  It was designed by architects of the United States Forest Service in rustic style.  The designs were applications of standard plans.

The contributing buildings are an office/residence, a residence, and a garage; the non-contributing ones include several sheds.

According to its nomination to the National Register:
The Brush Creek Work Center is significant ... for its association with expansion of Forest Service administration from custodial superintendence to active resource management. Built by the Civilian Conservation Corps, it reflects the contribution of this Federal Works program to the expansion of Forest Service resource management during the 1930s. It is also significant [architecturally] because it embodies a distinctive style of architecture developed by the Forest Service during the Depression-era. The use of standard plans was typical of remote Forest Service installations and the log building style conformed well with the forested surroundings. The buildings represent a distinctive Forest Service architectural design style and philosophy.

It was built by the Civilian Conservation Corps, with first logs cut in 1937 and completion in 1941.

The site is located in a valley of Barrett Creek and Brush Creek.

It was listed on the NRHP on April 11, 1994.

References

External links
Brush Creek Work Center, at Wyoming State Historic Preservation Office

United States Forest Service architecture
Park buildings and structures on the National Register of Historic Places in Wyoming
Government buildings completed in 1937
Buildings and structures in Carbon County, Wyoming
Medicine Bow National Forest
Rustic architecture in Wyoming
Historic districts on the National Register of Historic Places in Wyoming
National Register of Historic Places in Carbon County, Wyoming
1937 establishments in Wyoming